Bizionia algoritergicola  is a bacterium from the genus of Bizionia which has been isolated from a copepod salin pond.

References

External links
Type strain of Bizionia algoritergicola at BacDive -  the Bacterial Diversity Metadatabase

Flavobacteria
Bacteria described in 2005